The 2011 Brisbane Broncos season was the 24th in the club's history. They competed in the NRL's 2011 Telstra Premiership, finishing the regular season 3rd (out of 16). The Broncos then came within one match of the grand final but were knocked out by eventual premiers, the Manly-Warringah Sea Eagles. It was the last season for Brisbane's captain, all-time top points scorer and most-capped player, Darren Lockyer. Lockyer was also named the Broncos player of the season.

2011 was the Broncos' first season under new CEO Paul White who replaced Bruno Cullen in the first week of January. The following month, head coach Ivan Henjak was replaced by his assistant Anthony Griffin. NRMA replaced WOW Sight & Sound as the naming-rights sponsor of the Broncos after signing a three-year multimillion-dollar deal.

Season summary
On 21 February Broncos CEO Paul White announced that Ivan Henjak would be replaced by his assistant Anthony Griffin as head coach of the club for the 2011 NRL season, less than three weeks out from its start. In round 1, The North Queensland Cowboys ended their 7-game losing streak against the Broncos with a hard-fought 16–14 win at Suncorp Stadium. It was only the 5th win the Cowboys have had over the Broncos in their 17-year history and it was only the Broncos' 4th loss in an opening round match in their 24-year history. In round 2, The Broncos had their first win in Canberra since 2005 with a 20–4 win over the Canberra Raiders. In round 3, Justin Hodges made an immediate impact for the Broncos playing his first game since 2009, scoring the match winning try with a 14–8 win over the Gold Coast Titans at Skilled Park. In round 12, the Broncos played their first Golden Point game since 2008, defeating the Canberra Raiders 25–24 at Suncorp Stadium. In round 22, Darren Lockyer equalled the all-time record for most career games of all-time playing 349-games. The Broncos hosted the New Zealand Warriors, in a tense game, the Broncos ran out winners 21–20 at Suncorp Stadium. In round 24, Broncos secured 3rd spot for the finals with a 26–6 win over the Newcastle Knights at Ausgrid Stadium. It was also the Broncos first ever away win in a Monday Night game. Brisbane finished the regular season in 3rd place on the ladder.

Darren Lockyer kicked the winning field goal to knock defending premiers, Wayne Bennett's St. George Illawarra Dragons out of the 2011 competition and bring his team to within one match of the grand final. However, in the process Lockyer also took an accidental knee from a teammate in the face, fracturing his cheekbone over ten-minute's before the game's end. Therefore, without their captain, Brisbane needed to defeat second-placed Manly-Warringah for a chance to play in the grand final.

Milestones
Round 1: Two players made their debuts for the club; Dane Gagai and Jack Reed. Both made their NRL debuts also.
Round 1: Dane Gagai and Jack Reed scored their 1st career tries.
Round 2: Alex Glenn played his 50th game for the club and his 50th career game.
Round 8: Darren Lockyer scored his 121st career try which moved him into second on the all-time try scoring list for the Brisbane Broncos behind Steve Renouf.
Round 12: Kurt Baptiste made his debut for the club and his debut in the NRL.
Round 13: Scott Anderson played his 50th career game.
Round 14: Shea Moylan made his debut for the club and his debut in the NRL.
Round 15: David Hala scored his 1st career try.
Round 16: Kurt Baptiste scored his 1st career try and Peter Wallace played his 100th career game.
Round 22: Jharal Yow Yeh played his 50th game for the club and his 50th career game. 
Round 22: Darren Lockyer played his 349th career game, equalling the all-time record of club appearances.
Round 23: Darren Lockyer played his 350th career game, broke the all-time record of club appearances.
Round 25: Ben Te'o played his 50th game for the club.

Squad list

Squad Movement

Gains

Losses

Re-signings

Ladder

Fixtures

Pre-season

Regular season

Finals

Statistics

Source:

Representative
The following players played a representative match in 2011.

Australian Kangaroos
Ben Hannant
Justin Hodges
Darren Lockyer
Corey Parker
Sam Thaiday
Jharal Yow Yeh

England
Jack Reed

New Zealand Kiwis
Gerard Beale
Alex Glenn

Indigenous All Stars
Jharal Yow Yeh

NRL All Stars
Ben Hannant
Darren Lockyer

Queensland Maroons
Ben Hannant
Justin Hodges
Darren Lockyer
Corey Parker
Sam Thaiday
Jharal Yow Yeh

Honours

League
Nil

Club
Player of the year: Darren Lockyer
Rookie of the year: Jack Reed
Back of the year: Darren Lockyer
Forward of the year: Corey Parker
Club man of the year: Kurt Richards

References

Brisbane Broncos seasons
Brisbane Broncos season